A list of films produced in Spain in 1975 (see 1975 in film).

1975

External links
 Spanish films of 1975 at the Internet Movie Database

1975
Spanish
Films